The Intiö water tower is an unused water tower in Oulu, Finland. The water tower of the Oulu Waterworks is located in the Intiö district.

The Intiö water tower was designed by architect J. S. Sirén and completed in 1927. It is the first water tower of the Oulu Waterworks. A water tower in Myllytulli had been built in 1921, but it was only used by the Veljekset Åström leather factory.

The water tower was closed in 1969 when a new water tower was opened in the Puolivälinkangas neighbourhood. The city of Oulu sold the water tower to a private person in 2015.

References

External links
 

Buildings and structures in Oulu
Intiö
Towers completed in 1927
Water towers in Finland